Primula 'Zebra Blue' is a cultivar of hybrid Primula, which was introduced in 2012. The cultivar was produced by plant breeder Stijn van Hoecke of the Belgian company Rudy Raes Bloemzaden nv.

Description 
Primula 'Zebra Blue' is a compact perennial cultivar, which hosts a basal rosette of green leaves. Plants produce large blooms from late winter to late spring. Flowers possess white petals with striking blue veining and a yellow centre.

Pests and diseases 
Primula 'Zebra Blue' can be susceptible to many pest species such as: aphids, weevils, slugs, snails, leaf miners and red spider mites. It can also be prone to diseases such as primula leaf spot, primula brown core and grey moulds.

References 

Primula
Ornamental plant cultivars